Nicholas James Sebastian Rowe (born 22 November 1966) is a British actor. At the start of his career he appeared as the lead in the 1985 film Young Sherlock Holmes.

Early life and education
Rowe was born in Edinburgh, Scotland, to English parents Alison, a singer, and Andrew Rowe, a Conservative Party Member of Parliament and editor. He received his formal education at Eton College, where he acted in school productions, and subsequently received a Bachelor of Arts degree in Hispanic studies from the University of Bristol.

Career
Rowe has appeared in a variety of films, television dramas and plays. He played Sherlock Holmes in Barry Levinson's film Young Sherlock Holmes, having read for the part while still at school. He returned to the role of Sherlock Holmes 30 years later in the 2015 film Mr. Holmes, in which he played the part in a film that the "real" Mr. Holmes, now a 93-year-old (played by Ian McKellen) goes to see at a theatre.

Personal life
Rowe was the partner of Lou Gish for six years until her death from cancer in February 2006. Rowe is married with a daughter (born 2009).

Filmography

Films

Television

Theatre

TV guest appearances

References

External links

1966 births
Living people
People educated at Eton College
People from Crouch End
Male actors from Edinburgh
Scottish male film actors
Scottish male television actors
Scottish people of English descent